Bailey Mills was a building contractor firm in Victoria, Texas, USA.  It was first known as Bailey Brothers Planing Mill.  The firm was founded in 1888 by brothers Samuel M. Bailey and Ira P. Bailey, both originally from Michigan.  It operated until 1917.  According to a study of historic resources in Victoria, the firm "erected some of Victoria's most important commercial and institutional buildings".

Operation
A number of the firm's works are listed on the U.S. National Register of Historic Places.

Company's works include:

Dr. L.W. and Martha E.S. Chilton House, 242 N. Chilton St. Goliad, TX (Mills, Bailey), NRHP-listed
E. J. Jecker House, 201 N. Wheeler Victoria, TX (Mills, Bailey), NRHP-listed
Keef-Filley Building, 214 S. Main Victoria, TX (Mills, Bailey), NRHP-listed
Randall Building, 103-105 W. Santa Rosa Victoria, TX (Mills, Bailey), NRHP-listed
Saint Mary's Catholic Church, 101 W. Church Victoria, TX (Mills, Bailey), NRHP-listed
Tasin House, 202 N. Wheeler Victoria, TX (Mills, Bailey), NRHP-listed

References

External links
Site Work Contractor

Defunct companies based in Texas
Construction and civil engineering companies of the United States